William Elden Bolcom (born May 26, 1938) is an American composer and pianist. He has received the Pulitzer Prize, the National Medal of Arts, a Grammy Award, the Detroit Music Award and was named 2007 Composer of the Year by Musical America. He taught composition at the University of Michigan from 1973 until 2008. He is married to mezzo-soprano Joan Morris.

Early life and education
Bolcom was born in Seattle, Washington. At age 11, he entered the University of Washington to study composition privately with George Frederick McKay and John Verrall and piano with Madame Berthe Poncy Jacobson. "He later studied with Darius Milhaud at Mills College while working on his Master of Arts degree, with Leland Smith at Stanford University while working on his D.M.A., and with Olivier Messiaen at the Paris Conservatoire, where he received the 2ème Prix de Composition".

Career
Bolcom won the Pulitzer Prize for music in 1988 for 12 New Etudes for Piano. In the fall of 1994, he was named the Ross Lee Finney Distinguished University Professor of Composition at the University of Michigan.  In 2006, he was awarded the National Medal of Arts. Notable students include Gabriela Lena Frank, Carter Pann, Elena Ruehr, Derek Bermel, Joel Puckett, and David T. Little.

As a pianist, Bolcom has performed and recorded frequently in collaboration with Joan Morris, whom he married in 1975. They have recorded more than two dozen albums together, beginning with the Grammy-nominated After the Ball, a collection of popular songs from around the turn of the 20th century. Their primary specialties in both concerts and recordings are show tunes, parlor, and popular songs from the late 19th and early 20th century by Henry Russell, Henry Clay Work and others, and cabaret songs. 

As a soloist, Bolcom has recorded his own compositions, as well as music by George Gershwin, Darius Milhaud and several of the classic ragtime composers. His compositions have been recognized and highlighted at Michigan State University in their Michigan Writers Series.

Works

Bolcom's earliest compositions were written when he was around eleven years old; his early influences include Roy Harris and Béla Bartók. His compositions from around 1960 employed a modified serial technique, under the influence of Pierre Boulez, Karlheinz Stockhausen, and Luciano Berio, whose music he particularly admired. In the 1960s he gradually began to embrace an eclectic use of a wider variety of musical styles. His goal has been to erase boundaries between popular music and art music.

He has composed four major operas. Three of them, McTeague, A View from the Bridge, and A Wedding were commissioned and premiered by the Lyric Opera of Chicago and conducted by Dennis Russell Davies. All of these were composed with librettist Arnold Weinstein, sometimes in collaboration with other writers. McTeague, based on the 1899 novel by Frank Norris, with libretto by Weinstein, was premiered on October 31, 1992. A View from the Bridge, with libretto by Weinstein and Arthur Miller, was premiered October 9, 1999. A Wedding, based on the 1978 motion picture by Robert Altman and John Considine, with libretto by Weinstein and Altman, was premiered on December 11, 2004. His fourth opera, Dinner at Eight, composed with librettist Mark Campbell, based on the George S. Kaufman and Edna Ferber play of the same name, was premiered March 11, 2017, by the commissioning organization, Minnesota Opera.

He has also composed concertos such as Lyric Concerto for Flute and Orchestra for James Galway, the Concerto in D for Violin and Orchestra for Sergiu Luca, the Concerto for Clarinet and Orchestra for Stanley Drucker, and Concert Suite for alto saxophone and band, composed for University of Michigan professor Donald Sinta in 1998. He composed his concerto Gaea for two pianos (left hand) and orchestra for Gary Graffman and Leon Fleisher, both of whom have suffered from debilitating problems with their right hands.  It received its first performance on April 11, 1996 by the Baltimore Symphony conducted by David Zinman. The concerto is constructed so that it can be performed in one of three ways, with either piano part alone with reduced orchestra, or with both piano parts and the two reduced orchestras combined into a full orchestra. This structure mimics that of a similar three-in-one work by his teacher, Darius Milhaud.

Bolcom's other works include nine symphonies, twelve string quartets, four violin sonatas, a number of piano rags (one written in collaboration with William Albright), four volumes of Gospel Preludes for organ, four volumes of cabaret songs, three musical theater works (Casino Paradise, Dynamite Tonite, and Greatshot; all with Weinstein), and a one-act chamber opera, Lucrezia, with librettist Mark Campbell. William Bolcom was also commissioned to write Recuerdos for two pianos by The Dranoff International Two Piano Foundation.

Song cycles 
Bolcom has written a number of song cycles. A very large portion of these song cycles were cabarets with lyrics by librettist/lyricist Arnold Weinstein and meant to be sung by mezzo-soprano Joan Morris, William Bolcom's wife. These 24 cabarets were released in four volumes from the 1970s to the 1990s and were released all together on CD. From the Diary of Sally Hemings, a song cycle for voice and piano, is a collaboration with playwright/librettist Sandra Seaton. Among Bolcom's other song cycles, the most well-known is his setting of William Blake's Songs of Innocence and of Experience. The recording of this massive work was estimated at $375,000 USD and its length stands at about two and a half hours..

Songs of Innocence and of Experience

Bolcom's setting of William Blake's Songs of Innocence and of Experience, a three-hour work for soloists, choruses, and orchestra, was a culmination of 25 years of work on the piece.

Inspiration 
At the age of seventeen, William Bolcom wanted to set the complete poems of Songs of Innocence and of Experience by William Blake to music. As he comprehended the huge diversity of the artistic ideas and the technical styles presented in the poems, he realized that he needed more musical vocabulary of different styles in order to complete his music. This realization also bolstered his ideas that genres of music should not be placed in a hierarchy and that there was no distinction between "serious" music and "popular" music.

Style and instrumentation
Bolcom incorporated a variety of different musical styles and genres in the music, including modern classical style using pentatonic scales, tonal classical style, bluegrass, country, soul, folk vaudeville, rock musical, and reggae. Bolcom has used instruments that are not usually used in a traditional orchestra but are used in the genres that he chose: saxophones, guitar, electric guitar, bass guitar, harmonica, electric violin, and "country, rock, and folk singers".

Premiere and performances
According to Naxos Records, the premiere of the Songs at the Stuttgart Opera in 1984 was followed by performances in Ann Arbor, Grant Park in Chicago, Illinois, the Brooklyn Academy of Music, St. Louis, Carnegie Hall, and London's Royal Festival Hall, the latter performed by the BBC Symphony Orchestra under the direction of Leonard Slatkin.

Awards and reception
In 2004, Naxos Records produced a recording of the Songs on location at Hill Auditorium, featuring the University of Michigan School of Music, Theatre & Dance Symphony Orchestra, the student choirs from the same university, University Musical Society Choral Union, Michigan State University Children's Choir, and a variety of solo instrumentalists and singers (who also included Joan Morris, wife of Bolcom). In 2006, it won four Grammy Awards for Best Choral Performance, Best Classical Contemporary Composition, Best Classical Album, and Best Producer of the Year, Classical.

Composer and critic Robert Carl has stated that Bolcom wrote seemingly disparate genres of music with "sincerity," without irony, "as equal partners," and with "love for and mastery of popular music".

Festivals
VocalEssence celebrated the music of William Bolcom with a two-week festival in Minneapolis and St. Paul, Minnesota in April 2007. Nine different performances and a number of master classes were part of the festival. The spotlight performance was of Bolcom's setting of William Blake's Songs of Innocence and of Experience, performed in Orchestra Hall in Minneapolis with over 400 musicians performing under projections of Blake's accompanying artwork by Wendell K. Harrington.

Eastern Michigan University Celebrated its 16th Biennial Contemporary Music Festival by featuring William Bolcom as a guest composer.  The three-day festival showcased a range of Bolcom's compositions as well as a discussion on "Musical Grass-Roots" led by Bolcom himself.

Le Piano Ouvert celebrated Bolcom's 75th birthday with a week of concerts and masterclasses in Paris in March 2014. William Bolcom and Joan Morris both performed, and were featured on France Musique in a series of live performances and interviews. The festival was directed by Guy Livingston, Anne de Fornel, and David Levi. Concerts were held at the Mona Bismarck American Center in Paris, and at the Hôtel Talleyrand on Place de la Concorde.

In April 2022, as part of the international Heidelberger Frühling Music Festival, William Bolcom's second piano concerto was premiered by Igor Levit and the Mahler Chamber Orchestra conducted by Elim Chan in the auditorium of the Neue Universität Heidelberg.

Ragtime/piano discography
See Joan Morris page for Bolcom and Morris Discography
Heliotrope Bouquet: Piano Rags 1900–1970,  Nonesuch Records, 1971
Bolcom Plays His Own Rags, Jazzology, 1972
Piano Music By George Gershwin, Nonesuch Records, 1973
Pastimes and  Piano Rags, Nonesuch Records, 1974
Ragtime Back To Back (with William Albright), U of M School of Music, 1976
Euphonic Sounds, Omega Classics, 1988 (Reissued in 2019 as Scott Joplin: Ragtime Piano Gems)

References

External links

 William Bolcom and Joan Morris's website
 William Bolcom's page at the Edward B. Marks Music Company website
 Rags to Riches: Alumnus of the Year
 William Bolcom on the LiederNet Archive Texts and titles of vocal settings in alphabetic order.
 Two Interviews with William Bolcom, June 29, 1986 (also Joan Morris); and November 5, 1992
 Performance of Graceful Ghost Rag

1938 births
20th-century American composers
20th-century American male musicians
20th-century American pianists
20th-century classical composers
20th-century classical pianists
21st-century American composers
21st-century American male musicians
21st-century American pianists
21st-century classical composers
21st-century classical pianists
Albany Records artists
American classical composers
American classical pianists
American contemporary classical composers
American male classical composers
American male classical pianists
American opera composers
Classical musicians from Michigan
Classical musicians from Washington (state)
Contemporary classical music performers
Grammy Award winners
Living people
Male opera composers
Members of the American Academy of Arts and Letters
Mills College alumni
Musicians from Seattle
Pulitzer Prize for Music winners
Pupils of Darius Milhaud
Ragtime composers
Ragtime pianists
United States National Medal of Arts recipients
University of Michigan faculty
University of Washington College of Arts and Sciences alumni